Change is the fourth studio album by The Dismemberment Plan.  It was released on October 23, 2001 on DeSoto Records. It was recorded by J. Robbins at Inner Ear Studios in Arlington, Virginia and it was mixed by Chad Clark.

Musical style
Compared to The Dismemberment Plan's previous album Emergency & I, Change is more somber musically, with more introspective lyrics. Lead singer Travis Morrison has called it his "night album," saying in an interview with Stylus Magazine:

Reception and legacy

Change was met with universal critical acclaim. On the review aggregation website Metacritic, the album has an 83 out of 100 based on ten reviews, indicating "universal acclaim". Nick Southall of Stylus Magazine called the album more focused than Emergency & I, writing, "With Change, however, The Dismemberment Plan feel little need to show off with self-conscious musical ostentation and excess, instead choosing to focus themselves on making a fantastic, understated and involving record." Pitchforks founder Ryan Schreiber praised the album's more sentimental sound, writing, "But metamorphosis can be a beautiful thing, and like the butterfly retains a part of the caterpillar, Change retains a part of the pre-mutated Dismemberment Plan. You see, they're still the same band they always were. They're just prettier now." Ted Alvarez of AllMusic also commended the album's new sound, writing, "It's difficult to chart the Dismemberment Plan's next move; their boundless creativity is their only fence. They could turn down an entirely new musical path, or they could always revisit their equally brilliant old territory. Either way, listeners are in for an original musical experience."

Michael O'Brien of PopMatters, on the other hand, was less positive about the album's new sound, writing, "For anyone who loved Emergency & I, or any of The Dismemberment Plan's other two records, Change sounds like The Dismemberment Plan on Quaaludes." O'Brien also called the album "an enjoyable record, a necessary record in the evolution of the band, but far from an essential listen." Robert Christgau of The Village Voice gave the album a three-star honorable mention rating, indicating "an enjoyable effort consumers attuned to its overriding aesthetic or individual vision may well treasure."

Change was named the 14th best album of 2001 by Pitchfork. The same website also placed the album at number 97 on its list of the top 200 albums of the 2000s.

Although not released as a single, a music video for "Time Bomb" was released in 2001 and was included the following year in the first Xbox Exhibition demo disk, part of a series released by Microsoft to promote upcoming Xbox titles and featuring music from independent acts.

Track listing

Personnel
The following people contributed to Change

The Dismemberment Plan
 Eric Axelson – bass, keyboards
 Jason Caddell – guitar, keyboards
 Joe Easley – drums
 Travis Morrison – vocals, guitar, keyboards

Additional personnel
 Bill Barbot - Label Design
 Chad Clark - Mixing
 Kim Coletta - Label Design
 J. Robbins - Engineer

See also
List of works in irregular time signatures

References

External links
 

2001 albums
The Dismemberment Plan albums
DeSoto Records albums
Albums produced by J. Robbins